Telford and Wrekin Council elections are held every four years. Telford and Wrekin Council is the local authority for the unitary authority of Telford and Wrekin in the ceremonial county of Shropshire, England. Until 1 April 1998 it was a non-metropolitan district. Since the last boundary changes in 2015, 54 councillors have been elected from 30 wards.

Political control
Wrekin district was created under the Local Government Act 1972 as a non-metropolitan district, with Shropshire County Council providing county-level services. The first election to the district council was held in 1973, initially operating as a shadow authority before coming into its powers on 1 April 1974. During 1974 the council changed the district's name to "The Wrekin" rather than just "Wrekin". On 1 April 1998 the district changed its name to "Telford and Wrekin" and became a unitary authority, becoming independent from Shropshire County Council. Political control of the council since 1974 has been held by the following parties:

Non-metropolitan district

Unitary authority

Leadership
The leaders of the council since 2008 have been:

Council elections
1973 Wrekin District Council election
1976 The Wrekin District Council election
1979 The Wrekin District Council election (New ward boundaries)
1983 The Wrekin District Council election
1987 The Wrekin District Council election (District boundary changes took place but the number of seats remained the same)
1991 The Wrekin District Council election
1995 The Wrekin District Council election
1997 Telford and Wrekin Council election (New ward boundaries)
2000 Telford and Wrekin Council election
2003 Telford and Wrekin Council election (New ward boundaries)
2007 Telford and Wrekin Council election
2011 Telford and Wrekin Council election
2015 Telford and Wrekin Council election (New ward boundaries)
2019 Telford and Wrekin Council election

By-election results
By-elections for individual seats can occur during a council's four-year term, for instance when a councillor dies or resigns their seat.

1997–2000

2000–2003

2003–2007

2007–2011

2011–2015

2015–2019

References

External links
Telford and Wrekin Council
Telford and Wrekin election results
By-election results

 
Council elections in Shropshire
Unitary authority elections in England